Francis Bonafede (born 14 July 1939) is a Monegasque sport shooter. He competed in the trap event at the 1960 Summer Olympics.

References

1939 births
Living people
Monegasque male sport shooters
Olympic shooters of Monaco
Shooters at the 1960 Summer Olympics